Yi mein is a variety of flat Cantonese egg noodles made from wheat flour. They are known for their golden brown color and chewy characteristics. The slightly chewy and slightly spongy texture of the noodles is due to the soda water used in making the dough, which is then fried and dried into flat patty-like dried bricks.

Preparation

The Yi mein noodles available at grocery stores were pre-cooked by machines the same way as the modern instant noodles are made. 
 
The noodles may be cooked a number of ways. They are boiled first, then can be stir fried, or used in soups or salads.  Good noodles maintain their elasticity, allowing the noodles to stretch and remain chewy.

Dishes
Yi mein noodles can be consumed directly or used in various dishes:

 Plain yi mein
 Plain yi mein with Chinese chives (韮黃)
 Dried fried yi mein (乾燒伊麵), often comes with Chinese chives and shiitake mushroom
 Crab meat yi mein (蟹肉伊麵)
 Lobster yi mein (龍蝦伊麵), it is sometimes served with cheese in Hong Kong.
 Yi mein with black mushrooms and eggplant
 Yi mein in soup
 I fu mie, dried fried yi mein noodle served in sauce with vegetables chicken or prawn.

Traditions
When yi mein is consumed on birthdays, it is generally referred to as longevity noodles or sau mein (壽麵/寿面).  The Chinese character for "long" (長壽麵/长寿面) is also added as a prefix to represent "long life". Usually it is consumed with longevity buns on such occasions.

Yi mein is also a popular Lunar New Year dish. Tradition holds that the chef cannot cut the noodles, and each strand should be eaten whole.

Gallery

See also
Ifumi
 Chinese noodles
 Instant noodles, another type of noodle that was also fried before packaging.
Mì
Wonton noodles

References

External links
E-fu noodles from The Cook's Thesaurus site

Cantonese cuisine
Chinese noodles
Hong Kong cuisine
Longevity